FC Baulmes is a Swiss football club based in Baulmes in canton Vaud. The club currently plays in the 1. Liga.

Current squad

External links
Soccerway profile

Football clubs in Switzerland
Association football clubs established in 1940
1940 establishments in Switzerland